The Terre Haute Huts were a minor league professional baseball team in Terre Haute, Indiana in the Three-I League.  The team was in existence from 1955 to 1956, and was affiliated with the Detroit Tigers.  They played at Indiana State University's Memorial Stadium.

They were also known as the Terre Haute Tigers, due to the affiliation with the parent club (Detroit Tigers).

Year-by-year record

References

Defunct minor league baseball teams
Defunct baseball teams in Indiana
Professional baseball teams in Indiana
Detroit Tigers minor league affiliates
1955 establishments in Indiana
1956 disestablishments in Indiana
Baseball teams disestablished in 1956
Baseball teams established in 1955